Eyes of the Heart may refer to:

Eyes of the Heart (album), by Keith Jarrett (1979)
Eyes of the Heart (film), a 1920 crime film
Eyes of the Heart, a 2004 play by Catherine Filloux
"Eyes of the Heart (Radio's Song)", song by India.Arie on the Radio film soundtrack (2003)
The Eyes of the Heart, 1999 memoir by Frederick Buechner
The Eyes of the Heart, a 2000 book by Jean-Bertrand Aristide 
The Eyes of the Heart, a 1905 play by Minnie Maddern Fiske